Ari Kagan (born Arkady Kagan in 1967) is an American politician who is a member of the New York City Council from the 47th district, representing Bensonhurst, Coney Island, Gravesend, and Sea Gate. Elected in November 2021, he assumed office on January 1, 2022.

Early life and education 
Kagan was born in Minsk in 1967. His parents were survivors of the Holocaust. His paternal grandmother Sofiya was killed in the Minsk ghetto in 1942 while his father Mikhail survived.

After graduating Secondary School No. 20 in Minsk, he joined the Soviet Army and attended Leningrad Suvorov School. In February 1984, he was admitted to the Journalism Department at Lvov Military Political College, from which he graduated in 1988.

In 1991, Kagan left the Soviet Army and the Soviet Communist Party. He said he "gradually became disillusioned with the Soviet-Communist ideology". He immigrated to the United States with his family in May 1993, after the collapse of the Soviet Union. In the U.S., he attended Zicklin School of Business at Baruch College and graduated with a degree in Business Administration, Marketing and Advertising in 1999.

In 2002, he legally changed his name from "Arkady" to "Ari" when he became naturalized as a U.S. citizen. In a 2010 interview, Kagan said of the name change: "Firstly, Ari is shorter than Arkady, and Americans do not distort my name, and secondly, I like my new name because it resembles the abbreviation of the words "America - Russia - Israel"."

Career

Journalism 
As a military journalist, he worked in Soviet Latvia with the newspapers Sovetskiy Tankist in Dobele and Dlya Rodiny! in Riga. Kagan said that he was "lucky to work in various papers during the Gorbachev era of Glasnost and Perestroika when criticism of authorities was allowed and sometimes even encouraged". He told TabletMag that "I was not a dissident. But I was honest with myself, with my family, with my readers." 

In Brooklyn, Kagan worked as a writer for the Russian-language newspapers Yevreiski Mir and Vecherniy New York. He also presented a weekly television program on the Brooklyn-based Russian Television Network of America (RTN).

Democratic Party politics 
In 2012, he was elected as a Democratic District Leader in the 45th New York State Assembly District and founded the political club Bay Democrats in 2014. In December 2022, Kagan switched parties from Democratic to Republican in December 2022, giving up his District Leader post.

Work for Elected Officials 
Kagan worked as a community liaison for Comptrollers John Liu and Scott Stringer, as an assistant to Congressman Michael McMahon and later as Director of District Operations to Council Member Mark Treyger, before succeeding Treyger in the City Council.

City Council 
In November 2021, he was elected to the New York City Council, succeeding Mark Treyger. He has announced that he would run for re-election.

After switching his party affiliation to Republican due to his strong disagreements with Democrats on public safety and many other issues, Kagan joined Republican minority conference in City Council. Council Speaker Adrienne Adams suggested Kagan may lose his position as Chair of the Council's Committee on Resiliency and Waterfronts. "Voters sent Council member Kagan to the Council as a member of the majority conference and this drastic about-face seriously calls into question his commitment to the policy priorities of our conference that will impact his committee roles, particularly his chairmanship given the fact that he is joining a party that denies climate change," Adams said. Kagan resigned from the Committee Chairmanship shortly after, telling the Daily News that "I resigned rather than to wait until being expelled by the Council leadership."

References 

Living people
Baruch College alumni
American people of Belarusian-Jewish descent
Jewish American people in New York (state) politics
Politicians from New York City
Politicians from Brooklyn
New York (state) Democrats
21st-century American Jews
Politicians from Minsk
1967 births